In mathematics, a hyperbola (pl. hyperbolas or hyperbolae ; adj. hyperbolic ) is a type of smooth curve lying in a plane, defined by its geometric properties or by equations for which it is the solution set.  A hyperbola has two pieces, called connected components or branches, that are mirror images of each other and resemble two infinite bows.  The hyperbola is one of the three kinds of conic section, formed by the intersection of a plane and a double cone.  (The other conic sections are the parabola and the ellipse. A circle is a special case of an ellipse.) If the plane intersects both halves of the double cone but does not pass through the apex of the cones, then the conic is a hyperbola.

Hyperbolas arise in many ways: 
 as the curve representing the reciprocal function  in the Cartesian plane,
 as the path followed by the shadow of the tip of a sundial,
 as the shape of an open orbit (as distinct from a closed elliptical orbit), such as the orbit of a spacecraft during a gravity assisted swing-by of a planet or, more generally, any spacecraft (or celestial object) exceeding the escape velocity of the nearest planet or other gravitational body,
 as the scattering trajectory of a subatomic particle (acted on by repulsive instead of attractive forces but the principle is the same),
 in radio navigation, when the difference between distances to two points, but not the distances themselves, can be determined,
and so on.

Each branch of the hyperbola has two arms which become straighter (lower curvature) further out from the center of the hyperbola. Diagonally opposite arms, one from each branch, tend in the limit to a common line, called the asymptote of those two arms. So there are two asymptotes, whose intersection is at the center of symmetry of the hyperbola, which can be thought of as the mirror point about which each branch reflects to form the other branch. In the case of the curve  the asymptotes are the two coordinate axes.

Hyperbolas share many of the ellipses' analytical properties such as eccentricity, focus, and directrix. Typically the correspondence can be made with nothing more than a change of sign in some term. Many other mathematical objects have their origin in the hyperbola, such as hyperbolic paraboloids (saddle surfaces), hyperboloids ("wastebaskets"), hyperbolic geometry (Lobachevsky's celebrated non-Euclidean geometry), hyperbolic functions (sinh, cosh, tanh, etc.), and gyrovector spaces (a geometry proposed for use in both relativity and quantum mechanics which is not Euclidean).

Etymology and history
The word "hyperbola" derives from the Greek , meaning "over-thrown" or "excessive", from which the English term hyperbole also derives. Hyperbolae were discovered by Menaechmus in his investigations of the problem of doubling the cube, but were then called sections of obtuse cones. The term hyperbola is believed to have been coined by Apollonius of Perga (c. 262–c. 190 BC) in his definitive work on the conic sections, the Conics. 
The names of the other two general conic sections, the ellipse and the parabola, derive from the corresponding Greek words for "deficient" and "applied"; all three names are borrowed from earlier Pythagorean terminology which referred to a comparison of the side of rectangles of fixed area with a given line segment. The rectangle could be "applied" to the segment (meaning, have an equal length), be shorter than the segment or exceed the segment.

Definitions

As locus of points 

A hyperbola can be defined geometrically as a set of points (locus of points) in the Euclidean plane:

A hyperbola is a set of points, such that for any point  of the set, the absolute difference of the distances  to two fixed points  (the foci) is constant, usually denoted by :

The midpoint  of the line segment joining the foci is called the center of the hyperbola. The line through the foci is called the major axis. It contains the vertices , which have distance   to the center. The distance  of the foci to the center is called the focal distance or linear eccentricity. The quotient  is the eccentricity .

The equation  can be viewed in a different way (see diagram):
If  is the circle with midpoint  and radius , then the distance of a point  of the right branch to the circle  equals the distance to the focus :

 is called  the circular directrix (related to focus ) of the hyperbola. This property should not be confused with the definition of a hyperbola with help of a directrix (line) below.

Hyperbola with equation y = A/x 

If the xy-coordinate system is rotated about the origin by the angle   and new coordinates  are assigned, then . 
The rectangular hyperbola  (whose semi-axes are equal) has the new equation .
Solving for  yields 

Thus, in an xy-coordinate system the graph of a function  with equation
 is a rectangular hyperbola entirely in the first and third quadrants with
the coordinate axes as asymptotes,
the line  as major axis ,
the center  and the semi-axis 
the vertices 
the semi-latus rectum and radius of curvature  at the vertices 
the linear eccentricity  and the eccentricity 
the tangent  at point 

A rotation of the original hyperbola by  results in a rectangular hyperbola entirely in the second and fourth quadrants, with the same asymptotes, center, semi-latus rectum, radius of curvature at the vertices, linear eccentricity, and eccentricity as for the case of  rotation, with equation 
  
the semi-axes 
the line  as major axis, 
the vertices 

The shape parameters  remain unchanged.

By the directrix property 

The two lines at distance  from the center and parallel to the minor axis are called directrices of the hyperbola (see diagram).

For an arbitrary point  of the hyperbola the quotient of the distance to one focus and to the corresponding directrix (see diagram) is equal to the eccentricity:

The proof for the pair  follows from the fact that  and  satisfy the equation

The second case is proven analogously.

The inverse statement is also true and can be used to define a hyperbola (in a manner similar to the definition of a parabola):

For any point  (focus), any line  (directrix) not through  and any real number  with  the set of points (locus of points), for which the quotient of the distances to the point and to the line is 

is a hyperbola.

(The choice  yields a parabola and if  an ellipse.)

Proof
Let  and assume  is a point on the curve. 
The directrix  has equation . With , the relation  produces the equations
 and 
The substitution  yields

This is the equation of an ellipse or a parabola or a hyperbola. All of these non-degenerate conics have, in common, the origin as a vertex (see diagram).

If , introduce new parameters  so that
, and then the equation above becomes 

which is the equation of a hyperbola with center , the x-axis as major axis and
the major/minor semi axis .

Construction of a directrix
Because of  point  of directrix  (see diagram) and focus  are inverse with respect to the circle inversion at circle  (in diagram green). Hence point  can be constructed using the theorem of Thales (not shown in the diagram). The directrix  is the perpendicular to line  through point . 
Alternative construction of : Calculation shows, that point  is the intersection of the asymptote with its perpendicular through  (see diagram).

As plane section of a cone  

The intersection of an upright double cone by a plane not through the vertex with slope greater than the slope of the lines on the cone is a hyperbola (see diagram: red curve). It turns out:  are the foci of the hyperbola.
 Let   be an arbitrary point of the intersection curve .
 The generatrix of the cone containing  intersects circle  at point  and circle  at a point .
Therefore, as point  moves along the red curve (hyperbola), line segment  simply rotates about apex without changing its length.

Pin and string construction 

The definition of a hyperbola by its foci and its circular directrices (see above) can be used for drawing an arc of it with help of pins, a string and a ruler:

 Choose the foci , the vertices  and one of the circular directrices , for example   (circle with radius )
Point  is marked at distance .
 A string with length  is prepared.
 One end of the string is pinned at point  on the ruler, the other end is pinned to point .
 Take a pen and hold the string tight to the edge of the ruler.

Steiner generation of a hyperbola 

The following method to construct single points of a hyperbola relies on the Steiner generation of a non degenerate conic section:

For the generation of points of the hyperbola  one uses the pencils at the vertices . The line segment   is divided into n equally-spaced segments and this division is projected parallel with the diagonal  as direction onto the line segment  (see diagram).

A better idea is extending the points already constructed by symmetry (see animation).

Remark:
 The Steiner generation exists for ellipses and parabolas, too. 
 The Steiner generation is sometimes called a parallelogram method because one can use other points rather than the vertices, which starts with a parallelogram instead of a rectangle.

Inscribed angles for hyperbolas y = a/(x − b) + c and the 3-point-form 

A hyperbola with equation  is uniquely determined by three points  with different x- and y-coordinates. A simple way to determine the shape parameters  uses the inscribed angle theorem for hyperbolas:

In order to measure an angle between two lines with equations   in this context one uses the quotient

Analogous to the inscribed angle theorem for circles one gets the

Inscribed angle theorem for hyperbolas:
 For four points   (see diagram) the following statement is true:
That means if

(Proof: straightforward calculation.

A consequence of the inscribed angle theorem for hyperbolas is the

3-point-form of a hyperbola's equation:
 The equation of the hyperbola determined by 3 points  is the solution of the equation 

As an affine image of the unit hyperbola x² − y² = 1 

Another definition of a hyperbola uses affine transformations:

Any hyperbola is the affine image of the unit hyperbola with equation .

parametric representation
If  are the column vectors of the matrix , the unit hyperbola  is mapped onto the hyperbola

 is the center,  a point of the hyperbola and  a tangent vector at this point. 

vertices
In general the vectors  are not perpendicular. That means, in general   are not the vertices of the hyperbola. But  point into the directions of the asymptotes. The tangent vector at point   is 

Because at a vertex the tangent is perpendicular to the major axis of the hyperbola one gets the parameter  of a vertex from the equation 

and hence from

which yields

(The formulae  were used.)

The two vertices of the hyperbola are  

implicit representation
.

hyperbola in space
The definition of a hyperbola in this section gives a parametric representation of an arbitrary hyperbola, even in space, if one allows  to be vectors in space.

As an affine image of the hyperbola y = 1/x 

Because the unit hyperbola  is affinely equivalent to the hyperbola , an arbitrary hyperbola can be considered as the affine image (see previous section) of the hyperbola 

The tangent vector is

At a vertex the tangent is perpendicular to the major axis. Hence 

and the parameter of a vertex is

The following properties of a hyperbola are easily proven using the representation of a hyperbola introduced in this section.

Tangent construction 

The tangent vector can be rewritten by factorization:

This means that

the diagonal   of the parallelogram  is parallel to the tangent at the hyperbola point   (see diagram).

This property provides a way to construct the tangent at a point on the hyperbola.

This property of a hyperbola is an affine version of the 3-point-degeneration of Pascal's theorem.

Area of the grey parallelogram
The area of the grey parallelogram  in the above diagram is

and hence independent of point . The last equation follows from a calculation for the case, where  is a vertex and the hyperbola in its canonical form

Point construction 

For a hyperbola with parametric representation  (for simplicity the center is the origin) the following is true:

For any two points   the points

are collinear with the center of the hyperbola (see diagram). 
The simple proof is a consequence of the equation  .

This property provides a possibility to construct points of a hyperbola if the asymptotes and one point are given.

This property of a hyperbola is an affine version of the 4-point-degeneration of Pascal's theorem.

Tangent–asymptotes triangle 

For simplicity the center of the hyperbola may be the origin and the  vectors  have equal length. If the last assumption is not fulfilled one can first apply a parameter transformation (see above) in order to make the assumption true.

For the intersection points of the tangent at point  with the asymptotes one gets the points 

The area of the triangle  can be calculated by a 2 × 2 determinant: 

(see rules for determinants).
The area of a rhombus is equal to one half of the product of its diagonals. The diagonals are the semi-axes  of the hyperbola. Hence:

The area of the triangle  is independent of the point of the hyperbola:

Reciprocation of a circle
The reciprocation of a circle B in a circle C always yields a conic section such as a hyperbola. The process of "reciprocation in a circle C" consists of replacing every line and point in a geometrical figure with their corresponding pole and polar, respectively. The pole of a line is the inversion of its closest point to the circle C, whereas the polar of a point is the converse, namely, a line whose closest point to C is the inversion of the point.

The eccentricity of the conic section obtained by reciprocation is the ratio of the distances between the two circles' centers to the radius r of reciprocation circle C. If B and C represent the points at the centers of the corresponding circles, then

Since the eccentricity of a hyperbola is always greater than one, the center B must lie outside of the reciprocating circle C.

This definition implies that the hyperbola is both the locus of the poles of the tangent lines to the circle B, as well as the envelope of the polar lines of the points on B. Conversely, the circle B is the envelope of polars of points on the hyperbola, and the locus of poles of tangent lines to the hyperbola. Two tangent lines to B have no (finite) poles because they pass through the center C of the reciprocation circle C; the polars of the corresponding tangent points on B are the asymptotes of the hyperbola. The two branches of the hyperbola correspond to the two parts of the circle B that are separated by these tangent points.

Quadratic equation
A hyperbola can also be defined as a second-degree equation in the Cartesian coordinates (x, y) in the plane,

provided that the constants Axx, Axy, Ayy, Bx, By, and C satisfy the determinant condition

This determinant is conventionally called the discriminant of the conic section.

A special case of a hyperbola—the degenerate hyperbola consisting of two intersecting lines—occurs when another determinant is zero:

This determinant Δ is sometimes called the discriminant of the conic section.

Given the above general parametrization of the hyperbola in Cartesian coordinates, the eccentricity can be found using the formula in Conic section#Eccentricity in terms of coefficients.

The center (xc, yc) of the hyperbola may be determined from the formulae

The principal axes of the hyperbola make an angle φ with the positive x-axis that is given by

Rotating the coordinate axes so that the x-axis is aligned with the transverse axis brings the equation into its canonical form

The major and minor semiaxes a and b are defined by the equations

where λ1 and λ2 are the roots of the quadratic equation

For comparison, the corresponding equation for a degenerate hyperbola (consisting of two intersecting lines) is

The tangent line to a given point (x0, y0) on the hyperbola is defined by the equation

where E, F and G are defined by

The normal line to the hyperbola at the same point is given by the equation

The normal line is perpendicular to the tangent line, and both pass through the same point (x0, y0).

From the equation

and for a point on the left branch,

This can be proved as follows:

If (x,y) is a point on the hyperbola the distance to the left focal point is

To the right focal point the distance is

If (x,y) is a point on the right branch of the hyperbola then  and

Subtracting these equations one gets

If (x,y) is a point on the left branch of the hyperbola then  and

Subtracting these equations one gets

In Cartesian coordinates

Equation 
If Cartesian coordinates are introduced such that the origin is the center of the hyperbola and the x-axis is the major axis, then the hyperbola is called east-west-opening and 
the foci are the points ,
For an arbitrary point  the distance to the focus  is 
 and to the second focus . Hence the point  is on the hyperbola if the following condition is fulfilled 

Remove the square roots by suitable squarings and use the relation  to obtain the equation of the hyperbola:

This equation is called the canonical form of a hyperbola, because any hyperbola, regardless of its orientation relative to the Cartesian axes and regardless of the location of its center, can be transformed to this form by a change of variables, giving a hyperbola that is congruent to the original (see below).

The axes of symmetry or principal axes are the transverse axis (containing the segment of length 2a with endpoints at the vertices) and the conjugate axis (containing the segment of length 2b perpendicular to the transverse axis and with midpoint at the hyperbola's center). As opposed to an ellipse, a hyperbola has only two vertices: . The two points  on the conjugate axes are not on the hyperbola.

It follows from the equation that the hyperbola is symmetric with respect to both of the coordinate axes and hence symmetric with respect to the origin.

Eccentricity
For a hyperbola in the above canonical form, the eccentricity is given by

Two hyperbolas are geometrically similar to each other – meaning that they have the same shape, so that one can be transformed into the other by rigid left and right movements, rotation, taking a mirror image, and scaling (magnification) – if and only if they have the same eccentricity.

Asymptotes 

Solving the equation (above) of the hyperbola for  yields

It follows from this that the hyperbola approaches the two lines  

These two lines intersect at the center (origin) and are called asymptotes of the hyperbola 

With the help of the second figure one can see that

From the Hesse normal form  of the asymptotes and the equation of the hyperbola one gets:
 The product of the distances from a point on the hyperbola to both the asymptotes is the constant  which can also be written in terms of the eccentricity e as 

From the equation  of the hyperbola (above) one can derive:
 The product of the slopes of lines from a point P to the two vertices is the constant 

In addition, from (2) above it can be shown that
 The product of the distances from a point on the hyperbola to the asymptotes along lines parallel to the asymptotes is the constant

Semi-latus rectum 
The length of the chord through one of the foci, perpendicular to the major axis of the hyperbola, is called the latus rectum. One half of it is the semi-latus rectum . A calculation shows

The semi-latus rectum  may also be viewed as the radius of curvature  at the vertices.

Tangent 
The simplest way to determine the equation of the tangent at a point  is to implicitly differentiate the equation  of the hyperbola. Denoting dy/dx as y′, this produces

A particular tangent line distinguishes the hyperbola from the other conic sections. Let f be the distance from the vertex V (on both the hyperbola and its axis through the two foci) to the nearer focus. Then the distance, along a line perpendicular to that axis, from that focus to a point P on the hyperbola is greater than 2f. The tangent to the hyperbola at P intersects that axis at point Q at an angle ∠PQV of greater than 45°.

Rectangular hyperbola
In the case  the hyperbola is called rectangular (or equilateral), because its asymptotes intersect at right angles. The graph of the equation  is a rectangular hyperbola.

Parametric representation with hyperbolic sine/cosine 
Using the hyperbolic sine and cosine functions , a parametric representation of the hyperbola  can be obtained, which is similar to the parametric representation of an ellipse:

which satisfies the Cartesian equation because 

Further parametric representations are given in the section Parametric equations below.

Conjugate hyperbola 
 also written as

In polar coordinates 

For pole = focus: 

The polar coordinates used most commonly for the hyperbola are defined relative to the Cartesian coordinate system that has its origin in a focus and its x-axis pointing towards the origin of the "canonical coordinate system" as illustrated in the first diagram.
In this case the angle  is called true anomaly.

Relative to this coordinate system one has that

and

for pole = center:

With polar coordinates relative to the "canonical coordinate system" (see second diagram)
one has that

Parametric equations 
A hyperbola with equation  can be described by several parametric equations:
 
  (rational representation).
 
 Tangent slope as parameter:
One gets
 
  is the upper, and  the lower half of the hyperbola. The points with vertical tangents (vertices ) are not covered by the representation.
 The equation of the tangent at point  is
 
 This description of the tangents of a hyperbola is an essential tool for the determination of the orthoptic of a hyperbola.

Hyperbolic functions

Just as the trigonometric functions are defined in terms of the unit circle, so also the hyperbolic functions are defined in terms of the unit hyperbola, as shown in this diagram.  In a unit circle, the angle (in radians) is equal to twice the area of the circular sector which that angle subtends.  The analogous hyperbolic angle is likewise defined as twice the area of a hyperbolic sector.

Let  be twice the area between the  axis and a ray through the origin intersecting the unit hyperbola, and define  as the coordinates of the intersection point.
Then the area of the hyperbolic sector is the area of the triangle minus the curved region past the vertex at :

which simplifies to the area hyperbolic cosine

Solving for  yields the exponential form of the hyperbolic cosine:

From  one gets

and its inverse the area hyperbolic sine:

Other hyperbolic functions are defined according to the hyperbolic cosine and hyperbolic sine, so for example

Properties

The tangent bisects the angle between the lines to the foci 

The tangent at a point  bisects the angle between the lines .
Proof
Let  be the point on the line  with the distance  to the focus  (see diagram,  is the semi major axis of the hyperbola). Line  is the bisector of the angle between the lines . In order to prove that  is the tangent line at point , one checks that any point  on line  which is different from  cannot be on the hyperbola. Hence  has  only point  in common with the hyperbola and is, therefore, the tangent at point . 
From the diagram and the triangle inequality one recognizes that  holds, which means: . But if  is a point of the hyperbola, the difference should be .

Midpoints of parallel chords 

The midpoints of parallel chords of a hyperbola lie on a line through the center (see diagram).

The points of any chord may lie on different branches of the hyperbola.

The proof of the property on midpoints is best done for the hyperbola . Because any hyperbola is an affine image of the hyperbola  (see section below) and an affine transformation preserves parallelism and midpoints of line segments, the property is true for all hyperbolas:
For two points  of the hyperbola 

the midpoint of the chord is 

the slope of the chord is 

For parallel chords the slope is constant and the midpoints of the parallel chords lie on the line 

Consequence: for any pair of points  of a chord there exists a skew reflection with an axis (set of fixed points) passing through the center of the hyperbola, which exchanges the points  and leaves the hyperbola (as a whole) fixed.

Because a skew reflection leaves the hyperbola fixed, the pair of asymptotes is fixed, too. Hence the midpoint  of a chord  divides the related line segment  between the asymptotes  into halves, too. This means that . This property can be used for the construction of further points  of the hyperbola if a point  and the asymptotes are given.

If the chord degenerates into a tangent, then the touching point divides the line segment between the asymptotes in two halves.

Orthogonal tangents – orthoptic

For a hyperbola  the intersection points of orthogonal tangents lie on the circle . 
This circle is called the orthoptic of the given hyperbola.

The tangents may belong to points on different branches of the hyperbola.

In case of  there are no pairs of orthogonal tangents.

Pole-polar relation for a hyperbola 

Any hyperbola can be described in a suitable coordinate system by an equation . The equation of the tangent at a point  of the hyperbola  is  If one allows  point  to be an arbitrary point different from the origin, then

point  is mapped onto the line , not through the center of the hyperbola.

This relation between points and lines is a bijection.

The inverse function maps

line  onto the point  and

line  onto the point 

Such a relation between points and lines generated by a conic is called pole-polar relation or just polarity. The pole is the point, the polar the line. See Pole and polar.

By calculation one checks the following properties of the pole-polar relation of the hyperbola:
 For a point (pole) on the hyperbola the polar is the tangent at this point.
 For a pole  outside the hyperbola the intersection points of its polar with the hyperbola are the tangency points of the two tangents passing .
 For a point within the hyperbola the polar has no point with the hyperbola in common. .

Remarks:
 The intersection point of two polars is the pole of the line through their poles.
 The foci  and  respectively and the directrices  and  respectively belong to pairs of  pole and polar.
Pole-polar relations exist for ellipses and parabolas, too.

Other properties
The following are concurrent: (1) a circle passing through the hyperbola's foci and centered at the hyperbola's center; (2) either of the lines that are tangent to the hyperbola at the vertices; and (3) either of the asymptotes of the hyperbola.
The following are also concurrent: (1) the circle that is centered at the hyperbola's center and that passes through the hyperbola's vertices; (2) either directrix; and (3) either of the asymptotes.

Arc length
The arc length of a hyperbola does not have an elementary expression. The upper half of a hyperbola can be parameterized as

After using the substitution , this can also be represented using the incomplete elliptic integral of the second kind  with parameter :

Using only real numbers, this becomes

Derived curves

Several other curves can be derived from the hyperbola by inversion, the so-called inverse curves of the hyperbola. If the center of inversion is chosen as the hyperbola's own center, the inverse curve is the lemniscate of Bernoulli; the lemniscate is also the envelope of circles centered on a rectangular hyperbola and passing through the origin. If the center of inversion is chosen at a focus or a vertex of the hyperbola, the resulting inverse curves are a limaçon or a strophoid, respectively.

Elliptic coordinates 
A family of confocal hyperbolas is the basis of the system of elliptic coordinates in two dimensions. These hyperbolas are described by the equation

where the foci are located at a distance c from the origin on the x-axis, and where θ is the angle of the asymptotes with the x-axis. Every hyperbola in this family is orthogonal to every ellipse that shares the same foci. This orthogonality may be shown by a conformal map of the Cartesian coordinate system w = z + 1/z, where z= x + iy are the original Cartesian coordinates, and w=u + iv are those after the transformation.

Other orthogonal two-dimensional coordinate systems involving hyperbolas may be obtained by other conformal mappings. For example, the mapping w = z2 transforms the Cartesian coordinate system into two families of orthogonal hyperbolas.

Conic section analysis of the hyperbolic appearance of circles

Besides providing a uniform description of circles, ellipses, parabolas, and hyperbolas, conic sections can also be understood as a natural model of the geometry of perspective in the case where the scene being viewed consists of circles, or more generally an ellipse. The viewer is typically a camera or the human eye and the image of the scene a central projection onto an image plane, that is, all projection rays pass a fixed point O, the center. The lens plane is a plane parallel to the image plane at the lens O.

The image of a circle c is 
a) a circle, if circle c is in a special position, for example parallel to the image plane and others (see stereographic projection),
b) an ellipse, if c has no point with the lens plane in common,
c) a parabola, if c has one point with the lens plane in common and
d) a hyperbola, if c has two points with the lens plane in common.

(Special positions where the circle plane contains point O are omitted.)

These results can be understood if one recognizes that the projection process can be seen in two steps: 1) circle c and point O generate a cone which is 2) cut by the image plane, in order to generate the image.

One sees a hyperbola whenever catching sight of a portion of a circle cut by one's lens plane. The inability to see very much of the arms of the visible branch, combined with the complete absence of the second branch, makes it virtually impossible for the human visual system to recognize the connection with hyperbolas.

Applications

Sundials
Hyperbolas may be seen in many sundials. On any given day, the sun revolves in a circle on the celestial sphere, and its rays striking the point on a sundial traces out a cone of light. The intersection of this cone with the horizontal plane of the ground forms a conic section. At most populated latitudes and at most times of the year, this conic section is a hyperbola. In practical terms, the shadow of the tip of a pole traces out a hyperbola on the ground over the course of a day (this path is called the declination line). The shape of this hyperbola varies with the geographical latitude and with the time of the year, since those factors affect the cone of the sun's rays relative to the horizon. The collection of such hyperbolas for a whole year at a given location was called a pelekinon by the Greeks, since it resembles a double-bladed axe.

Multilateration
A hyperbola is the basis for solving multilateration problems, the task of locating a point from the differences in its distances to given points — or, equivalently, the difference in arrival times of synchronized signals between the point and the given points. Such problems are important in navigation, particularly on water; a ship can locate its position from the difference in arrival times of signals from a LORAN or GPS transmitters. Conversely, a homing beacon or any transmitter can be located by comparing the arrival times of its signals at two separate receiving stations; such techniques may be used to track objects and people. In particular, the set of possible positions of a point that has a distance difference of 2a from two given points is a hyperbola of vertex separation 2a whose foci are the two given points.

Path followed by a particle
The path followed by any particle in the classical Kepler problem is a conic section. In particular, if the total energy E of the particle is greater than zero (that is, if the particle is unbound), the path of such a particle is a hyperbola. This property is useful in studying atomic and sub-atomic forces by scattering high-energy particles; for example, the Rutherford experiment demonstrated the existence of an atomic nucleus by examining the scattering of alpha particles from gold atoms. If the short-range nuclear interactions are ignored, the atomic nucleus and the alpha particle interact only by a repulsive Coulomb force, which satisfies the inverse square law requirement for a Kepler problem.

Korteweg–de Vries equation
The hyperbolic trig function  appears as one solution to the Korteweg–de Vries equation which describes the motion of a soliton wave in a canal.

Angle trisection

As shown first by Apollonius of Perga, a hyperbola can be used to trisect any angle, a well studied problem of geometry. Given an angle, first draw a circle centered at its vertex O, which intersects the sides of the angle at points A and B. Next draw the line segment with endpoints  A and B and its perpendicular bisector . Let P be the intersection (upper) of the hyperbola with the circle. Angle POB trisects angle AOB.

To prove this, reflect the line segment OP about the line  obtaining the point P' as the image of P. Segment AP' has the same length as segment BP due to the reflection, while segment PP' has the same length as segment BP due to the eccentricity of the hyperbola. As OA, OP', OP and OB are all radii of the same circle (and so, have the same length), the triangles OAP', OPP' and OPB are all congruent. Therefore, the angle has been trisected, since 3×POB = AOB.

Efficient portfolio frontier
In portfolio theory, the locus of mean-variance efficient portfolios (called the efficient frontier) is the upper half of the east-opening branch of a hyperbola drawn with the portfolio return's standard deviation plotted horizontally and its expected value plotted vertically; according to this theory, all rational investors would choose a portfolio characterized by some point on this locus.

Biochemistry
In biochemistry and pharmacology, the Hill equation and Hill-Langmuir equation respectively describe biological responses and the formation of protein–ligand complexes as functions of ligand concentration. They are both rectangular hyperbolae.

Hyperbolas as plane sections of quadrics 
Hyperbolas appear as plane sections of the following quadrics:
 Elliptic cone 
 Hyperbolic cylinder
 Hyperbolic paraboloid
 Hyperboloid of one sheet
 Hyperboloid of two sheets

See also

Other conic sections

Circle
Ellipse
Parabola
Degenerate conic

Other related topics

Elliptic coordinates, an orthogonal coordinate system based on families of ellipses and hyperbolas.
Hyperbolic growth
Hyperbolic partial differential equation
Hyperbolic sector
Hyperboloid structure
Hyperbolic trajectory
Hyperboloid
Multilateration
Rotation of axes
Translation of axes
Unit hyperbola

Notes

References

External links

 
 Apollonius' Derivation of the Hyperbola at Convergence
 Frans van Schooten: Mathematische Oeffeningen, 1659
 

Conic sections
Analytic geometry
Algebraic curves